Lyttelton is a suburb of Centurion in Gauteng Province, South Africa.

References

Suburbs of Centurion, Gauteng